Rearview Mirror: An American Musical Journey is an album by American singer-songwriter Don McLean, released in 2005.

Track listing
If You Could Read My Mind
Vincent (Starry, Starry Night)
Wonderful Baby
Love Me Tender
(It Was) A Very Good Year
El Paso
My Saddle Pals and I
And I Love You So
Crying
Empty Chairs
Homeless Brother
TB Blues
Magdalene Lane
Infinity
Prime Time
American Pie
Run, Diana Run
You've Got to Share

Notes
"If You Could Read My Mind" composed by Gordon Lightfoot
"Love Me Tender" composed by George R. Poulton and Ken Darby, credited to Vera Matson and Elvis Presley
"(It Was) A Very Good Year" composed by Ervin Drake
"El Paso" composed by Marty Robbins
"My Saddle Pals and I" composed by Roy Rogers
"Crying" composed by Joe Melson and Roy Orbison
"TB Blues" composed by Jimmie Rodgers

References

Don McLean albums
2005 albums